Djolu is a territory of the Democratic Republic of the Congo.  It is located in Tshuapa Province.

References
Statoids.com  Retrieved December 8, 2010.

Territories of Tshuapa Province